Lumala Abdu (born 21 July 1997) is a Ugandan professional footballer who plays as a forward for Egyptian club Pyramids and the Uganda national team.

Club career

Early years
Abdu grew up with his grandmother in the village of Kataba since his mother had died when he was just a few months old and since the father was unknown. When he was 10 he was given a Henrik Larsson-shirt as a birthday present by his aunt. In hope of receiving a better life his grandmother sent him away to the capital Kampala when he was 16. Abdu took many jobs, mostly washing cars before he met a few white Europeans who managed to get him on a plane to Sturup Airport.

Sweden
He was left alone on the streets of Malmö and there he contacted Migrationsverket. They managed to get accommodation for Abdu in the little town of Bromölla. There he started training with the local club Ifö/Bromölla playing in the Swedish 5th tier, but after not managing to find any football shoes he and a friend moved to 9th tier side Gualövs GoIF. He was instantly made captain and after scoring 20 goals in 10 games big local club Mjällby AIF signed him in the summer of 2014. He played the rest of the year with the U17s and U19s. Before the next season Abdu was moved up to the A-Team playing in Swedish second division Superettan. He impressed, scoring 3 goals in 24 games being only 17 when the season started. The rumours of his talent spread and clubs like Malmö FF and Olympiacos wanting to sign him.

Kalmar FF
Abdu instead ended up in Swedish top flight club Kalmar FF. In his first season, he played 10 league matches.

Loans
Ahead of the 2017 season Abdu was loaned out to Superettan club Varbergs BoIS. After half a season with the club, he returned to Kalmar FF just to be loaned out once again, this time to his idol Henrik Larsson's mother club Helsingborgs IF. He made his debut in a game against GAIS. At the back of Abdu's shirt it says "Lumalinho".

Pyramids FC
In July 2019, Abdu joined Egyptian Premier League club Pyramids FC where he linked up with former Uganda coach Sébastien Desabre.

International career
He made his Uganda national football team debut on 9 June 2019 in a friendly against Turkmenistan, as a starter.

Career statistics

Club

International

References

1997 births
Living people
Association football forwards
Ugandan footballers
Uganda international footballers
Kalmar FF players
Mjällby AIF players
Varbergs BoIS players
Helsingborgs IF players
IFK Värnamo players
Syrianska FC players
Pyramids FC players
Allsvenskan players
Superettan players
Ugandan expatriate footballers
Expatriate footballers in Sweden
2019 Africa Cup of Nations players